This is a list of episodes from the sixth season of Happy Days.

Main cast
 Ron Howard as Richie Cunningham
 Henry Winkler as Arthur "Fonzie" Fonzarelli
 Marion Ross as Marion Cunningham
 Anson Williams as Warren "Potsie" Weber
 Don Most as Ralph Malph
 Erin Moran as Joanie Cunningham
 Al Molinaro as Alfred "Al" Delvecchio
 Scott Baio as Chachi Arcola
 Tom Bosley as Howard Cunningham

Guest stars
 Lynda Goodfriend as Lori Beth Allen
 Ed Peck as Officer Kirk
 Suzi Quatro as Leather Tuscadero 
Lorrie Mahaffey as Jennifer Jerome
 Pat Morita as Arnold
 Penny Marshall as Laverne De Fazio
 Cindy Williams as Shirley Feeney
 Robin Williams as Mork
 Michael McKean as Leonard "Lenny" Kosnowski
 David L. Lander as Andrew "Squiggy" Squiggman
 Eddie Mekka as Carmine Ragusa

Broadcast history
The season aired Tuesdays at 8:00-8:30 pm (EST).

Episodes

References

Happy Days 06
1978 American television seasons
1979 American television seasons